Mohamed Said (1988) is a Swedish actor. He lives in Huddinge Stockholm. He played as a walker on in Daniel Fridell's full-length film Säg att du älskar mig (Say that you love me) in 2006. He took part in Borta bra, a short film.
He is known for his role in Swedish Television's drama series Andra Avenyn.

His parents are Iraqi.

Filmography 
Säg att du älskar mig, (in Swedish) 2006 (Walker on)
Andra Avenyn (TV series), 2007
Borta Bra, 2007

Sources

1987 births
Iraqi emigrants to Sweden
Living people
People from Baghdad
Swedish male actors